Duane Linklater (born 1976) is an artist of Omaskêko Cree ancestry.

Biography
Born in Moose Factory, Ontario, Canada, Linklater now lives in North Bay. He is married to artist-choreographer, Tanya Lukin Linklater.

Linklater attended the University of Alberta from 2000-2005 and was awarded a Bachelor of Native Studies and a Bachelor of Fine Arts. He also studied at Bard College's Milton Avery Graduate School of the Arts from 2010 and completed a Master of Fine Arts in video and film in 2012.

Selected exhibitions
Linklater has exhibited his work at various galleries and exhibitions including the Art Gallery of Ontario (2013);  documenta 14; the Utah Museum of Fine Arts (2015); the Vancouver Art Gallery (2015); and the Art Gallery of Alberta (2016). In 2018, Linklater installed pêyakotênaw—a public artwork comprising three large teepee sculptures—along the High Line in New York. Linklater was featured in the 2022 Whitney Biennial: Quiet as It's Kept, at the Whitney Museum of American Art, New York. In 2023, the Art Gallery of Hamilton exhibited Duane Linklater: they have piled the stone / as they promised / without syrup which explored the architecture of the Bishop Fauquier Memorial Chapel in Sault Ste. Marie, Ontario, a small Gothic and Tudor style sandstone chapel built in 1881. He is represented by Catriona Jeffries Gallery.

Selected works 
 Modest Livelihood, a project with Brian Jungen about a hunting trip that was commissioned for documenta (13) curated by Carolyn Christov-Bakargiev.
 Distances, Origins, and Other Concerns, an open letter to the Metropolitan Museum of Art in New York City critical of the institution's display of a Cree object from the mid-1800s that was commissioned for Art in General by curator Laurel Ptak.
 Mikikwan (2018), a concrete reproduction of a hide scraper.
 Tautology (2011-2013), a neon bird appropriated from a prominent painting by Norval Morrisseau.
 Cape Spear, a five-year intervention editing the Cape Spear Wikipedia page to add the words "At 6:24am NST 3/10/2011, Duane Linklater watched the sunrise. He traveled there to see the sunrise, to be the first one before anyone else."
 Learning, an exhibition in the Susan Hobbs Gallery, Toronto, organized by Althea Thauberger.
 What Then Remains, a permanent installation inside the longest wall in Mercer Union, Toronto.
 Monsters for beauty, permanence and individuality, 14 cast concrete sculptures at Don River Valley Park in Toronto.

Awards 
In 2013, Linklater won the $50,000 Sobey Art Award.
In May 2016, along with Geoffrey Farmer, Linklater was the inaugural recipient of a Be3Dimensional Innovation Fund grant of $50,000 for a 3D printing project.
In July 2016, Linklater won the $15,000 Victor Martyn Lynch-Staunton Award for Media Arts, awarded by the Canada Council for the arts. In 2017, Linklater was awarded a public commission for the Don River Valley Park, Toronto.

References

Sources
 
 
 
 
 
 
 
 
 
 

1976 births
Artists from Ontario
Canadian installation artists
Canadian performance artists
First Nations artists
Living people
People from Cochrane District
People from North Bay, Ontario
Cree people
University of Alberta alumni
Bard College alumni